(Latin for Doctoral graduation under the auspices of the Federal President), often abbreviated as  doctoral graduation, is a special form of doctoral graduation and the highest possible distinction for academic achievements for a doctoral degree in Austria.

(Monarchy) 
Awards comparable to the  graduation can be traced back to the foundation of universities at the end of the Middle Ages and can be found in verifiable  (Latin , 'emperor') since the first half of the 17th century. The  is first mentioned in a document of the University of Graz, where under Emperor Ferdinand II the tribute was paid to a count in 1625. First presented in Vienna in 1661, this custom continued until the end of the Austro-Hungarian Empire.

Until the middle of the 18th century, the honour was almost exclusively bestowed on sons of the high nobility, but already during the reign of Maria Theresa the regulations were relaxed. Of the graduations held under her, 31 (of a total of 53) were already bourgeois. The first woman, however, was not awarded a doctorate under the auspices of the Federal President until 1953 at the University of Vienna.

For the earliest period of this type of excellence doctorate, there is neither an imperial decree nor a university directive that makes the necessary conditions for being awarded a doctorate under the auspices of the emperor apparent. However, the sources do show that the same conditions had to be met from the very beginning of the award, which were later—as an important milestone—stipulated by a ministerial order of 28 August 1888, which listed as requirements not only the excellent performance at school and university, but also dignified conduct by the chosen candidate.

The solemn ceremonial act has essentially been preserved since the 17th century. After the reception of the imperial representative, the seats were taken in compliance with a certain seating order and accompanied by the sounds of the marching fanfares. This was followed by the welcoming of the guests and a brief overview of the history of the award. Afterwards the Dean presented the candidate in front of the assembly, who bowed three times before the portrait of the Emperor and handed out his printed theses. Only then the actual disputation began. After this the candidate bowed again and was led to the emperor's representative who, after a speech, presented him with the imperial gift.

(Austrian Second Republic) 
More than 33 years after the collapse of the Austro-Hungarian Empire, on 5 March 1952, the Second Republic passed a federal law on the awarding of doctorates under the auspices of the Federal President, which is extremely concise. 
The following persons are granted to receive their doctorate under the auspices of the Federal President

Has completed the upper classes of a secondary school with very good results,
Has passed the Matura at a secondary school with distinction,
Has completed the university studies in all subjects with the best examination result as defined in the applicable study regulations and has passed all the strict examinations required to obtain the doctorate with distinction,
Has written a scientific paper (dissertation), if one is required, which was evaluated as excellent by the reviewers,
The duration of studies may not exceed the average duration of studies, unless there are good reasons for a delay (e.g. work as a student trainee, illness and the like).
Has proven to be worthy of distinction through his or her behaviour both at and outside the university.

Requirement according to today's school and study law

The Federal Law on the award of doctorates under the auspices of the Federal President was last amended in 1968, so it needs to be interpreted in the context of the school and study law in force today. The mandatory requirements for the  doctorate according to today's view are

 Excellence in all upper grades of a secondary school
 Matriculation examination (Matura) with distinction
 In the course of study, very good grades in all partial examinations of the diploma, bachelor and master examinations as well as in the final examination.
 Best marks for the scientific written papers (diploma or master thesis and dissertation)

The requirements are determined by the Senate of the University by notice and submitted to the Federal Ministry of Education, Science and Research and the Presidential Chancellery for approval. While conventional doctorates are only of a formal nature,  candidates may not hold the academic degree doctor) until after the  ceremony.

Ceremony 

The PhD celebration itself is a special ceremony for the doctoral candidates and takes place in the presence of President of Austria (he may, however, send a representative, which in practice generally only happens in case of illness). The doctoral candidate is free to give a "speech on a scientific topic approved by the highest academic authority".

After the actual doctoral graduation with the oath and pledge, the Federal President bestows the ring of honour with the inscription  on the candidate who has now been awarded the doctorate.

Ring of honor 
Since 1820, a ring of honour bearing the name of the reigning monarch has been awarded as a gift of honour to all sub auspiciis graduates. Since March 1952, section 4 of the Federal Law on the award of doctorates under the auspices of the Federal President has stipulated that the Federal President awards all doctors who have received their doctorates under his auspices a ring of honour, the seal of which contains the federal coat of arms and the words . On the occasion of the 60th anniversary of the Federal Law in 2012, a redesign of the ring of honour was commissioned, which has been awarded since the end of 2013.

Statistics 
Currently, an average of about 20 students per year receive their doctorate  (out of a total of about 2500 doctoral students per year) in Austria. In the first 60 years since the passing of the Federal Law on the Award of Doctorates under the auspices of the Federal President on 5 March 1952, 1042 (296 women and 746 men) have been awarded the corresponding doctorates.
  Since 1952, nine people have succeeded in obtaining doctorates in two subjects  each.

Notable recipients 

  (theologist)
  (pharmacologist, former president of the Austrian Academy of Sciences)
 Heinz Engl (mathematician)
 Hildegard Goss-Mayr (peace activist and writer, first woman to receive the doctorate  at a Viennese university in 1953)
 Harald Grobner (mathematician)
 Victor Franz Hess (Nobel laureate in physics 1936,  1906 under Emperor Franz Joseph)
Lothar Höbelt (historian)
  (gynaecologist)
 Lisa Kaltenegger (astronomer and astrophysicist)
 Markus Müller (pharmacologist, rector of the Medical University of Vienna)
 Harald Niederreiter (mathematician)
  (manager and member of the board of Uniqa Österreich AG)
  (mathematician)

Erwin Schrödinger and the  doctoral graduation 
The Austrian physicist and Nobel laureate Erwin Schrödinger (Nobel Prize in Physics 1933) would have fulfilled all the requirements for the doctoral graduation  in 1910, but at the University of Vienna only three candidates per year were allowed to receive this honour. Erwin Schrödinger would have been the fourth. He was awarded a doctorate in 1910, only four years after his Matura in July 1906, without an honorary doctorate to become a doctor of philosophy.

The  is a non-profit association founded in Vienna in 2016 with the aim of establishing a network of  graduates and using this network for the promotion of gifted students in Austria.

Literature 
 Walter Brunner: Die Promotio sub auspiciis. 2., ergänzte Auflage. Bundesministerium für Wissenschaft und Forschung, Wien 1990, .
 Bundesministerium für Wissenschaft und Forschung (Hrsg.): Im Zeichen der Ringe. 60 Jahre Promotion unter den Auspizien des Bundespräsidenten, Wien 2012 (mit namentlicher Auflistung der über 1000 sub auspiciis Promovierten im Zeitraum 20. Dezember 1952 bis 5. März 2012).

External links 

 Bundesgesetz über die Verleihung des Doktorates unter den Auspizien des Bundespräsidenten (Statutory source)
 Bundesgesetz über die Verleihung eines Ehrenringes durch den Bundespräsidenten

References 

Academia in Austria
Academic awards